Rosemont is a village in Cook County, Illinois, United States. Located immediately northwest of Chicago, as of the 2020 census it had a population of 3,952. The village was incorporated in 1956, though it had been settled long before that. While Rosemont's land area and population are relatively small among municipalities in the Chicago Metropolitan Area, the village is a major center for commercial activity in the region and is a key component of the Golden Corridor.

Due to its proximity to several interstates, O'Hare International Airport, and downtown Chicago, it has emerged as a significant edge city and entertainment district, with corporate facilities, millions of square feet of office space, nearly 50 restaurants, 15 hotels, the  Donald E. Stephens Convention Center (home to conventions and trade shows), the 16,000+ seat Allstate Arena (home to the Chicago Wolves, Chicago Sky, DePaul Blue Demons until 2017, and concerts and other live entertainment events), the 4,000+ seat Rosemont Theatre, the 130-store Fashion Outlets of Chicago, the Rosemont Stadium (home to an outdoor collegiate-level softball stadium and 140,000 sq ft indoor sports dome), Impact Field (home to the Chicago Dogs independent minor league baseball team), and the entertainment complex Parkway Bank Park, which features restaurants, entertainment and a large common area used for summer concerts and ice skating in the winter. Rosemont is near Rivers Casino in Des Plaines and additional hotels, offices, restaurants, and corporate facilities in the adjacent O'Hare neighborhood of Chicago and nearby suburban communities such as Des Plaines and Schiller Park.

The Scott Street subdivision in Rosemont is a gated community, as a result of the 1995 decision by residents. Visitors to the Scott Street subdivision are subject to a visual inspection and questioning by Rosemont Police. However, visitors who refuse questioning are still permitted to enter the subdivision.

Geography
Rosemont is at  (41.990730, −87.873816).

Demographics
As of the 2020 census there were 3,952 people, 1,597 households, and 1,016 families residing in the village. The racial makeup of the village was 56.05% White, 2.76% African American, 2.10% Native American, 5.29% Asian, 0.13% Pacific Islander, 20.57% from other races, and 13.11% from two or more races. Hispanic or Latino of any race were 39.50% of the population.

There were 1,597 households, out of which 46.96% had children under the age of 18 living with them, 45.40% were married couples living together, 6.45% had a female householder with no husband present, and 36.38% were non-families. 33.81% of all households were made up of individuals, and 12.90% had someone living alone who was 65 years of age or older. The average household size was 3.38 and the average family size was 2.61.

The village's age distribution consisted of 19.9% under the age of 18, 10.9% from 18 to 24, 28.8% from 25 to 44, 29.2% from 45 to 64, and 11.3% who were 65 years of age or older. The median age was 37.0 years. For every 100 females, there were 112.8 males. For every 100 females age 18 and over, there were 107.6 males.

The median income for a household in the village was $56,432, and the median income for a family was $70,909. Males had a median income of $36,504 versus $27,750 for females. The per capita income for the village was $28,034. About 11.6% of families and 10.8% of the population were below the poverty line, including 6.3% of those under age 18 and 15.5% of those age 65 or over.

Economy
Rosemont is positioned between O'Hare International Airport and the rest of the City of Chicago. Due to its location, much of the village is occupied by large hotels and office buildings. Several major hotel chains operating in the United States have a presence in Rosemont, including Global Hyatt, Hilton Hotels Corporation, Marriott International, Loews Corporation, Best Western, and InterContinental Hotels Group, among others.

Corporate headquarters in the village include those of Culligan, US Foods, Velsicol Chemical Corporation, World Kitchen, Riddell, Reyes Holdings, the Big Ten Conference, and Haribo of America.

Additionally, Rosemont operates several visitor related-forums. Among these are the Donald E. Stephens Convention Center, used for trade shows and gatherings; the Rosemont Theater, used for theatrical purposes; and the Allstate Arena, used for concerts, professional wrestling (three times hosting WrestleMania), Chicago Wolves hockey, and formerly the DePaul Blue Demons basketball program and Chicago Sky WNBA basketball .

The village is the sponsor of the Cavaliers Drum and Bugle Corps.

The village hosts Midwest FurFest, Exxxotica Expo, and Anime Central annually, among other big name fan conventions.

Emirates airline has its Chicago-area offices in the Columbia Centre in Rosemont.

Education
Rosemont Elementary School District 78 operates Rosemont Elementary School. Other area schools include Orchard Place School in Des Plaines, operated by the Des Plaines School District 62; East Leyden High School in Franklin Park, operated by the Leyden High School District 212; and Maine West High School in Des Plaines, operated by Maine Township High School District 207. The area that serves District 78 is in the district served by  East Leyden High School, and the area served by district 62 is served by Maine West High School, the total two public high schools that serve the village. The village's area community college is Triton College.

Sports
Rosemont's Allstate Arena is home to the Chicago Wolves of the American Hockey League, and has previously been home to the WNBA's Chicago Sky, and the DePaul University basketball team. Starting in 2011, the Chicago Bandits women's National Pro Fastpitch team moved to Rosemont after playing in Elgin and Lisle in the past.

The Allstate Arena hosted the regional final and semifinal games in the 2005 NCAA Division I men's basketball tournament.

The Allstate Arena was home to the Chicago Bruisers, an original member of the Arena Football League in 1987. When the Bruisers advanced to the league championship in 1988, Rosemont hosted ArenaBowl II, as well as an arena football test game in 1987.

Rosemont is home to The Cavaliers Drum and Bugle Corps, seven-time DCI world champion.

Rosemont is home to Suma1L, a professional esports athlete for Dota 2's Evil Geniuses team.  He was the youngest esports player to earn $1 million in prize money.

In March 2013, Rosemont was named a possible location for a replacement of Wrigley Field.

Since October 2013, the Big Ten Conference's headquarters have been in the Rosemont Financial District.

Rosemont is home to the Chicago Dogs, an independent league baseball team. The team is part of the American Association of Independent Professional Baseball and play in a 6,300-seat ballpark, Impact Field. The club played their first games in May 2018.

Transportation
Rosemont has a station on the North Central Service, which provides weekday rail service between Antioch and Chicago Union Station.

Rosemont has a station on the Blue Line of the Chicago "L", which provides direct rail service to O'Hare International Airport and downtown Chicago.

In the 1990s, there had been efforts to construct a personal rapid transit system in the village.

Politics 
Since the village of Rosemont was incorporated in 1956, one family, the Stephens family, has governed it. Some members of the family enjoy lucrative village jobs. Christopher Stephens runs the village-run convention center and made $255,600 per year between 2015-2018. (The median household income in Rosemont is less than $47,000.) Christopher's uncle, Brad Stephens, is the mayor of Rosemont. In 2017, village trustees voted to increase his salary by 53 percent to $260,000, making him one of the highest paid mayors in the United States.

Village presidents
The following is a list of the village presidents (mayors) of Rosemont:

See also

Death of Kenneka Jenkins, a young woman who died of hypothermia in a Rosemont hotel freezer

References

External links

Village of Rosemont official website

 
Villages in Illinois
Populated places established in 1956
Villages in Cook County, Illinois
Chicago metropolitan area
Entertainment districts in the United States